"Fall in Love" is a song by Nigerian singer and harmonica player D'banj. It serves as a single from his third studio album, The Entertainer (2008), and was produced by Don Jazzy. According to Africa Review, it earned D'banj national stardom in Nigeria. "Fall in Love" was nominated for Song of the Year at The Headies 2009. The music video for the song won Most Gifted Afro Pop Video at the 2010 Channel O Music Video Awards. Moreover, it was also nominated in the Best Male Music Video of the Year (Artist & Director) category at the 2010 Nigeria Entertainment Awards.

Music videos
There were two music videos released for the song. The first music video was released on January 26, 2010, and features the 2010 finalists of Face of Africa. The finalists selected for the video were told to play various video vixen characters, including "Rock Chick", "Russian Princess", and "Harajuku Girl". Mo' Hits Records decided to shoot another music video after the first one received negative reviews from critics, who felt it didn't complement the song. Moreover, numerous critics thought it was a bit naive to hire models to play the role of vixens.

The second music video was released on May 4, 2010; it stars Nollywood actress Genevieve Nnaji. Nollywood Watch reported that Nnaji was paid ₦2 million for the role she played in the music video. Prior to the release of the music video, there were reports about a romance between Nnaji and D'banj. In an interview with Toolz on NdaniTV's The Juice, D'banj confirmed the report surrounding his affair with the actress. He said they were in a brief relationship.

Live performances
D'banj and Don Jazzy performed the song together at the former's sister wedding ceremony for the first time since splitting.

Accolades

References

2009 songs
2009 singles
D'banj songs
Song recordings produced by Don Jazzy